Thomas J. Peters (born November 7, 1942) is an American writer on business management practices, best known for In Search of Excellence (co-authored with Robert H. Waterman Jr.)

Life and education
Peters was born in Baltimore, Maryland. He went to Severn School, a private, preparatory high school, graduating in 1960. Peters then attended Cornell University, receiving a bachelor's degree in civil engineering in 1964, and a master's degree in 1966.

He returned to academia in 1970 to study business at Stanford Business School receiving an MBA followed by a PhD in Organizational Behavior in 1977. The title of his dissertation was "Patterns of Winning and Losing: Effects on Approach and Avoidance by Friends and Enemies." Karl Weick credited Peters' dissertation with giving him the idea for his 1984 article: "Small wins: Redefining the scale of social problems."
 
While at Stanford, Peters was influenced by Jim G. March, Herbert Simon (both at Stanford), and Karl Weick (at the University of Michigan). Later, he noted that he was influenced by Douglas McGregor and Einar Thorsrud.

In 2004, he also received an honorary doctorate from the State University of Management in Moscow.

Career
From 1966 to 1970, he served in the United States Navy, making two deployments to Vietnam as a Navy Seabee, then later working in the Pentagon.  From 1973 to 1974, he worked in the White House as a senior drug-abuse advisor, during the Nixon administration. Peters has acknowledged the influence of military strategist Colonel John Boyd on his later writing.

From 1974 to 1981, Peters worked as a management consultant at McKinsey & Company, becoming a partner and Organization Effectiveness practice leader in 1979. In 1981, he left McKinsey to become an independent consultant.

In 1990, Peters was referred to in a British Department of Trade and Industry (DTI) publication as one of the world's Quality Gurus.

In 1995, the New York Times referred to Peters as one of the top three business experts in the highest demand as a speaker along with Daniel Burrus and Roger Blackwell.

By 2000, Peters was noted for his ever-increasingly aggressive and sometimes "crackpot" demeanor while at the same time his target audiences had changed towards the considerably lower ranks of SMI management.
 
In 2017, "Thinkers50" awarded Peters with its Lifetime Achievement Award for his paving the way for the "thought leadership" and business book industries.

In Search of Excellence
The publication of the popular business book In Search of Excellence in 1982 marked a turning point in Peters' career.

Peters states that directly after graduating with a PhD from Stanford in 1977, and returning to McKinsey, the new managing director, Ron Daniel, handed him a "fascinating assignment." Motivated by the new ideas coming from Bruce Henderson's Boston Consulting Group, Daniel noted that businesses often failed to effectively implement new strategies, so Peters "was asked to look at 'organization effectiveness' and 'implementation issues' in an inconsequential offshoot project nested in McKinsey's rather offbeat San Francisco office."

In Search of Excellence]]  became a bestseller, gaining exposure in the United States at a national level when a series of television specials based on the book and hosted by Peters appeared on PBS. The primary ideas espoused solving business problems with as little business-process overhead as possible, and empowering decision-makers at multiple levels of a company.

The December 2001 issue of Fast Company quoted Peters admitting that he and Waterman had falsified the underlying data for In Search of Excellence. He is quoted as saying, " This is pretty small beer, but for what it's worth, okay, I confess: We faked the data. A lot of people suggested it at the time." He later insisted that this was untrue and that he was the victim of an "aggressive headline."

Later work
In 1987 Peters published Thriving on Chaos: Handbook for a Management Revolution.

In later books, Peters has encouraged personal responsibility in response to the "New Economy."

More recent books are The Excellence Dividend, released in April 2018, and Excellence Now: Extreme Humanism, released in 2021.

Peters currently lives in South Dartmouth, MA with his wife Susan Sargent, and continues to write and speak about personal and business empowerment and problem-solving methodologies.

His namesake company "Tom Peters Company" is based in Essex, UK.

Works 
 1982 – In Search of Excellence (co-written with Robert H. Waterman, Jr.)
 1985 – A Passion for Excellence (co-written with Nancy Austin)
 1987 – Thriving on Chaos
 1992 – Liberation Management
 1994 – The Tom Peters Seminar: Crazy Times Call for Crazy Organizations
 1994 – The Pursuit of WOW!
 1997 – The Circle of Innovation: You Can't Shrink Your Way to Greatness
 1999 - The Reinventing Work Series 50List Books
 1999 – The Brand You 50: Or: Fifty Ways to Transform Yourself from an "Employee" into a Brand That Shouts Distinction, Commitment, and Passion!  (Reinventing Work Series)  
 1999 - The Project50: Fifty Ways to Transform Every "Task" into a Project That Matters! (Reinventing Work Series)  
 1999 - The Professional Service Firm50: Fifty Ways to Transform Your "Department" into a Professional Service Firm Whose Trademarks are Passion and Innovation! (Reinventing Work Series)  
 2003 – Re-imagine! Business Excellence in a Disruptive Age
 2005 – Talent
 2005 – Leadership
 2005 – Design
 2005 – Trends (co-written with Martha Barletta)
 2010 – The Little Big Things: 163 Ways to Pursue Excellence
 2018 – The Excellence Dividend: Meeting the Tech Tide with Work That Wows and Jobs That Last
 2021 – Excellence Now: Extreme Humanism
 2022 – Tom Peters' Compact Guide to Excellence [with Nancye Green]

References

Further reading
Speechtek biography
 Stewart Crainer: Corporate Man to Corporate Skunk: The Tom Peters Phenomenon, Oxford, 1997
 Winfried W. Weber: Innovation durch Injunktion, Goettingen, 2005
 Tom Peters: The Bestselling Prophet of the Management Revolution (part of a 4-book series of business biographies on Peters, Bill Gates, Peter Drucker, and Warren Buffett)
 The Brand Called You FastCompany magazine, 1997.
 Tom Peters Interview - The Excellence Dividend Online Personals Watch, 2018.

External links

tompeters – official site

1942 births
American business writers
American management consultants
Business speakers
Cornell University College of Engineering alumni
Living people
McKinsey & Company people
Writers from Baltimore
People from Tinmouth, Vermont
Stanford Graduate School of Business alumni
Writers from Vermont